Uranium carbide, a carbide of uranium, is a hard refractory ceramic material. It comes in several stoichiometries (x differs in ), such as uranium methanide (UC, CAS number 12070-09-6), uranium sesquicarbide (U2C3, CAS number 12076-62-9),
and uranium acetylide (UC2, CAS number 12071-33-9).

Like uranium dioxide and some other uranium compounds, uranium carbide can be used as a nuclear fuel for nuclear reactors, usually in the form of pellets or tablets. Uranium carbide fuel was used in late designs of nuclear thermal rockets.

Uranium carbide pellets are used as fuel kernels for the US version of pebble bed reactors; the German version uses uranium dioxide instead.

As nuclear fuel, uranium carbide can be used either on its own, or mixed with plutonium carbide (PuC and Pu2C3). The mixture is also labeled as uranium-plutonium carbide ( (U,Pu)C ).

Uranium carbide is also a popular target material for particle accelerators.

Ammonia synthesis from nitrogen and hydrogen is sometimes accomplished in the presence of uranium carbide acting as a catalyst.

See also
 Uranium boride
 Thorium carbide

References

Carbides
Uranium compounds
Nuclear materials
Rock salt crystal structure